Wydminy  is a village in Giżycko County, Warmian-Masurian Voivodeship, in north-eastern Poland. It is the seat of the gmina (administrative district) called Gmina Wydminy. It is situated on the southern shore of Wydmińskie Lake in Masuria.

The village has a population of 2,300.

As of 1600, the population of the village was exclusively Polish.

Wydminy is a member of Cittaslow.

Transport
There is a train station in Wydminy, and the Voivodeship road 655 passes through the village.

References

Populated lakeshore places in Poland
Villages in Giżycko County
Cittaslow